The List of members from the fifth term of the Assembly of Experts. consists of names of the members during the fifth and current term of the Assembly of Experts from 2016 to 2024. Elections for the Assembly of Experts occurs every 8 years.

"Assembly of experts (of the Leadership)", or the "Council of Experts" is the deliberative body empowered to appoint and dismiss the Supreme Leader of Iran; and Seyyed Ali Khamenei is the current Supreme Leader of Iran.

The elections took place on 26 February 2016, with the Inauguration occurring on 24 May 2016.

Members 

The list is ordered Alphabetically.

Members with * next to their name, indicates they died while in office.

 Alborz

  
  

 Ardabil

 Seyed Fakhreddin Mousavi * (18 September 2021)
 Seyed Hassan Ameli

 Bushehr

 Seyed Hashem Hosseini Bushehri

 Chaharmahal and Bakhtiari

 

 East Azerbaijan

 Ali Malakouti
 Hashem Hashemzadeh Herisi 
 Mohammad Feyz Sarabi * (11 April 2022)
 Mohammad Taghi Pourmohammadi
 Mohsen Mojtahed Shabestari * (17 November 2021)

 Fars

 Ahmad Beheshti
 
 Assad-Allah Imani * (7 May 2018)
 Lotfollah Dezhkam (Replaced Assad-Allah Imani in midterm election Feb 2020) 
 Seyed Ali Asghar Dastgheib
 Seyed Mohammad Faghie * (22 March 2022)

 Gilan

  
 Reza Ramezani Gilani
  
 Zaynolabideen Ghorbani

 Golestan

  
 Seyed Kazem Nourmofidi

 Hamadan

 
 Seyed Mostafa Mousavi Faraz

 Hormozgan

  

 Ilam

 

 Isfahan

 
 Abdul-Nabi Namazi
 Morteza Moghtadai
 
 Seyed Yousef Tabatabai Nejad

 Kerman

 Ahmad Khatami
  
  

 Kermanshah

 
 

 Khuzestan

 Abbas Ka'bi
 Abdul Karim Farhani
 
 Mohsen Heidari Alekasir
 Seyed Ali Shafiei
 Seyed Mohammad Ali Mousavi Jazayeri

 Kohgiluyeh and Boyer-Ahmad

 

 Kurdistan

 
 

 Lorestan

 Ahmad Moballeghi
 

 Markazi

 Ahmad Mohseni Garakani
 Mohsen Araki

 Mazandaran

 
  * (8 February 2020) 
 Sadeq Larijani
 
 Seyed Sadegh Pishnamazi - (Replaced Norallah Tabresi in second midterm election in June 2021)

 North Khorasan

  (Replaced Habiollah Mehman Navaz in midterm election Feb 2020)
  * (22 April 2018) 

 Qazvin

 
 

 Qom

 Mohammad Momen * (21 February 2019)
 Mohammad Yazdi (Replaced Mohammad Momen in midterm elections Feb 2020) * (9 December 2020)
 Seyed Mohammad Saeedi (Replaced Mohammad Yazdi in second midterm elections in June 2021)

 Razavi Khorasan

  
 Mohammad-Hadi Abdekhodaei
 Mohammad-Taqi Mesbah-Yazdi (Replaced Seyed Mahmoud Hashemi Shahroudi in midterm election Feb 2020) * (1 January 2021)
 Seyed Ahmad Alamolhoda
 Seyed Ahmad Hosseini Khorasani
 Seyed Mahmoud Hashemi Shahroudi * (24 December 2018)
 Seyed Mohammad-Reza Modarresi Yazdi (Replaced Mohammad-Taqi Mesbah-Yazdi in the second midterm elections in June 2021)
 Seyed Mojtaba Hosseini

 Semnan

 Seyed Mohammad Shahcheraghi

 Sistan and Baluchestan

 Abbas-Ali Soleimani
 

 South Khorasan

 Seyed Ebrahim Raisi

 Tehran

 Abbas Ali Akhtari (Replaced Nasrallah Shah Abadi in midterm elections in Feb 2020) * (31 October 2022)
 Alireza Arafi (Replaced Seyed Hashem Bathaie Golpayegani in second midterm elections in June 2021)
 Ahmad Daneshzadeh Momen - (Replaced Mohammad-Ali Taskhiri in second midterm elections in June 2021)
 Ahmad Jannati
 Akbar Hashemi Rafsanjani * (8 January 2017)
  (Replaced Akbar Hashemi Rafsanjani in midterm elections in Feb 2020)
 Ali Movahedi-Kermani
 Ebrahim Amini * (24 April 2020)
 Gholamreza Mesbahi-Moghaddam (Replaced Seyed Abolfazel Mir Mohammadi in midterm elections in Feb 2020)
 Ghorbanali Dorri-Najafabadi
 Hassan Rouhani
  (Replaced Ebrahim Amini in second midterm elections in June 2021)
 Mohammad-Ali Taskhiri * (18 August 2020)
 Mohammed Emami-Kashani
  
 Mohammad Reyshahri * (21 March 2022)
 Mohsen Esmaeili (First non-Mujtahid to be elected in Assembly of Experts)
 Mohsen Qomi
 Nasrallah Shah Abadi * (12 March 2018) 
  * (24 November 2019)
 Seyed Hashem Bathaie Golpayegani * (16 March 2020)
 Seyed Mahmoud Alavi

 West Azerbaijan

 Asghar Dirbaz
 Javad Mojtahed Shabestari
 Seyed Ali Akbar Ghoreishi

 Yazd

 Abolghasem Wafi Yazdi

 Zanjan

See also
 List of chairmen of the Assembly of Experts
 2016 Iranian Assembly of Experts election
 Results of the 2016 Iranian Assembly of Experts election
 List of members in the First Term of the Council of Experts
List of members in the Second Term of the Council of Experts
List of members in the Third Term of the Council of Experts
List of members in the Fourth Term of the Council of Experts

References 

Assembly of Experts
Lists of office-holders
Electoral colleges
Politics of Iran
Government of the Islamic Republic of Iran
Assemblies in Iran